Milavče is a municipality and village in Domažlice District in the Plzeň Region of the Czech Republic. It has about 600 inhabitants.

Administrative parts
Villages of Božkovy and Radonice are administrative parts of Milavče.

Notable people
Josef Váchal (1884–1969), writer and painter

History
On 4 August 2021 two trains collided near the village.

References

Villages in Domažlice District